Fort Edward station (also known as the Fort Edward–Glens Falls) is an intercity train station in Fort Edward, New York. It was originally built as a Delaware and Hudson Railroad depot in 1900, as a replacement for two earlier stations. The first was built in 1840 but was later converted into a store in 1880, the same year it was replaced with a second depot on the existing site. The third and current station has been listed on the National Register of Historic Places since December 13, 2000. The station serves both Fort Edward and nearby Glens Falls. It has one low-level side platform to the west of the single track of the Canadian Pacific Railway Canadian Subdivision.

The station is served by Amtrak's daily Adirondack and Ethan Allen Express.  The station also is a stop on the Greater Glens Falls Transit's Hudson Falls/Fort Edward line (Route 4) providing bus service to Glens Falls and surrounding communities Monday through Saturdays, as well as seasonal "train-catcher" service to Lake George, New York.

In March 2020, all Amtrak service at the station was suspended indefinitely, with trains being truncated to Albany–Rensselaer station as part of a round of service reductions in response to the ongoing coronavirus pandemic. Ethan Allen Express service between New York City and Rutland, Vermont resumed on July 19, 2021, however the Adirondack service between New York City and Montreal has yet to resume daily operations.

, the station is occupied by Evergreen Bicycle Works.

References

External links

Edward Fort Edward Depot (Bridge Line Historical Society)
Ford Edward Station (Great Railroad Stations Index)

Amtrak stations in New York (state)
Former Delaware and Hudson Railway stations
Railway stations in the United States opened in 1900
Railway stations on the National Register of Historic Places in New York (state)
Transportation buildings and structures in Washington County, New York
Transportation in Capital District (New York)
National Register of Historic Places in Washington County, New York